Capri-Revolution is a 2018 Italian-French period drama film co-written and directed by Mario Martone. It was selected to be screened in the main competition section of the 75th Venice International Film Festival.

Plot
In 1914, with Italy about to enter World War I, a commune of young artists from Northern Europe establishes itself on the rural island of Capri, a safe haven for dissidents and nonconformists from all over the world, like Russian exiles led by Maxim Gorky, preparing to an upcoming revolution. Here, local girl Lucia meets Seybu, the charming leader of the commune, and Carlo, a young doctor.

Cast

 Marianna Fontana as Lucia
 Reinout Scholten van Aschat as Seybu
  as Carlo
 Jenna Thiam as Lilian
 Lola Klamroth as Nina 
 Ludovico Girardello as Luca
 Maximilian Dirr as Herbert
 Gianluca Di Gennaro as Antonio
 Donatella Finocchiaro as Maria
 Eduardo Scarpetta as Vincenzo
 Rinat Khismatouline as Maxim Gorky
 Agnieszka Jania as Carmela

Production
Martone took the inspiration for the story from the life of German artist Karl Wilhelm Diefenbach.

Principal photography began on 24 August 2017 in San Mauro Cilento, Italy. Filming took place also in Capri, Gaeta and Cilento. The film was shot under the working title of Capri-Batterie, inspired by a 1985 concept art work of the same name by Joseph Beuys.

Release
Capri-Revolution premiered in competition at the 75th Venice International Film Festival on 6 September 2018. It was released in Italy by 01 Distribution on 20 December 2018.

References

External links
 

2018 films
2018 drama films
Italian drama films
2010s Italian-language films
French drama films
Films directed by Mario Martone
Films set in 1914
Films set in Capri, Campania
2010s French films
Italian-language French films